St Matthew's Church, Custom House, was a Church of England church on Ethel Road in the Victoria Docks area of West Ham. It is named after its district, Custom House.

It was built in 1860 as a mission church of St Mark's Church, Silvertown and paid for by Charles Morrison, chairman of the Dock company. It later became a mission church of St Luke's, before being turned into a parish of its own in 1920. After 1945 it was served by clergy from the Church of the Ascension until 1960, when St Matthew's was closed - its parish was merged into that of Ascension the following year. It had been demolished for redevelopment by 1966.

References

Matthew's
Matthew's
1860 establishments in England
1960 disestablishments in England
19th-century Church of England church buildings